The Apostolic Nunciature to Paraguay is an ecclesiastical office of the Catholic Church in Paraguay. It is a diplomatic post of the Holy See, whose representative is called the Apostolic Nuncio with the rank of an ambassador.

List of papal representatives
Apostolic Delegates
Vincenzo Massoni (26 September 1856 – 3 June 1857)
Marino Marini (14 August 1857 – 27 March 1865)
Angelo Di Pietro (31 December 1877 – 30 September 1879)
Luigi Matera (19 September 1879 – 14 October 1884)
Antonio Sabatucci (24 October 1900 – 9 November 1906)
Apostolic Internuncios
Alberto Vassallo di Torregrossa (5 January 1920 – 14 July 1922)
 Title is Nuncio as of 6 August 1920
Apostolic Nuncios 
Beda Giovanni Cardinale (16 October 1922 – 29 August 1925)
Filippo Cortesi (14 June 1928 – 4 June 1936)
Giuseppe Fietta (11 December 1936 – 12 November 1939)
Albert Levame (12 November 1939 – 17 December 1941)
Liberato Tosti (5 September 1946 – 4 October 1948)
Federico Lunardi (8 July 1949 – 9 November 1954)
Luigi Punzolo (7 December 1954 – 12 December 1957)
Carlo Martini (25 March 1958 – 29 November 1963)
Vittore Ugo Righi (1 February 1964 – 1967)
Antonio Innocenti (15 December 1967 – 26 February 1973)
Joseph Mees (11 July 1973 – 19 January 1985)
Giorgio Zur (3 May 1985 – 13 August 1990)
José Sebastián Laboa Gallego (21 August 1990 – 18 March 1995)
Lorenzo Baldisseri (6 April 1995 – 19 June 1999)
Antonio Lucibello (27 July 1999 – 27 August 2005)
Orlando Antonini (16 November 2005 – 8 August 2009)
Eliseo Antonio Ariotti (5 November 2009 – present)

See also
Foreign relations of the Holy See
List of heads of the diplomatic missions of the Holy See

References

Paraguay
 
Holy See–Paraguay relations